Evgeniia Galaktionova (born 12 April 2000) is a Russian Paralympic athlete. She won the bronze medal in the women's shot put F32 event at the 2020 Summer Paralympics held in Tokyo, Japan. She competed at the Summer Paralympics under the flag of the Russian Paralympic Committee.

References

External links 
 

Living people
2000 births
People from Pyatigorsk
Russian female shot putters
Paralympic athletes of Russia
Athletes (track and field) at the 2020 Summer Paralympics
Medalists at the 2020 Summer Paralympics
Paralympic bronze medalists for the Russian Paralympic Committee athletes
Paralympic medalists in athletics (track and field)
Medalists at the World Para Athletics European Championships
Medalists at the World Para Athletics Championships
Sportspeople from Stavropol Krai
21st-century Russian women